Pentasachme is a species of plants in the Apocynaceae first described as a genus in 1834. It contains only one recognized species, Pentasachme caudatum, native to southern China, the Indian Subcontinent, and Southeast Asia.

formerly included
moved to other genera (Cynanchum, Heterostemma)
 P. brachyantha now  Cynanchum stauntonii  
 P. esquirolii now  Heterostemma esquirolii  
 P. glaucescens now  Cynanchum glaucescens 
 P. stauntonii now  Cynanchum stauntonii

species of uncertain affinities
 Pentasachme fasciculatum (Buch.-Ham. ex Wight) M.R.Almeida - India
 Pentasachme pulcherrima Grierson & D.G. Long -  Bhutan, Nepal 
 Pentasachme shanense MacGregor & W. W. Smith - Myanmar
 Pentasachme wallichii Wight - Himalayas

References

Monotypic Apocynaceae genera
Asclepiadoideae